David Ferry is a Canadian actor and Dora Award–winning theatre director. 

Ferry was nominated for a Genie Award, for best supporting actor in Hounds of Notre Dame. He was also star of the popular Canadian radio programme "Midnight Cab". He was born in St. John's, Newfoundland.

Filmography
 1978 High-Ballin' 
 1979 Parallels
 1980 The Hounds of Notre Dame
 1989 The Last Winter
 1995 Darkman II: The Return of Durant
 1996 Night of the Twisters
 1998 Glory & Honor
 1999 Resurrection
 1999 The Boondock Saints 
 1999 Storm of the Century
 2000 The Crossing
 2006 Man of the Year
 2009 The Boondock Saints II: All Saints Day
 2018 The Detail
 2020 The Oak Room

References

External links 
 
 Canadian Theatre Encyclopedia

Canadian male film actors
Canadian male television actors
20th-century Canadian male actors
21st-century Canadian male actors
Canadian male voice actors
Canadian male stage actors
Canadian theatre directors
Dora Mavor Moore Award winners
Living people
Male actors from Newfoundland and Labrador
People from St. John's, Newfoundland and Labrador
Year of birth missing (living people)